The Gorge can refer to the following:

The Columbia River Gorge, a section of the Columbia River in Washington and Oregon
The Gorge Amphitheatre, a concert venue in George, Washington, United States of America
The Gorge (album), a live album by the Dave Matthews Band from The Gorge Amphitheatre
Live at the Gorge 05/06, a live box set by Pearl Jam from The Gorge Amphitheare
 The Gorge, a geological feature of Federated Women's Club State Forest in Massachusetts, United States of America
The Gorge, Shropshire, a civil parish in Shropshire, England
Cataract Gorge, a river gorge located in Launceston, Tasmania, Australia
Vikos Gorge, Pindus Mountains, Greece
 The Gorge and Gorge Water, part of the inner reaches of Victoria Harbour, British Columbia
 A 1968 television play by Peter Nichols, in the BBC's Wednesday Play series

See also 
Canyon
Thalweg